The 1960 Campeonato Brasileiro Série A (officially the 1960 Taça Brasil) was the 2nd edition of the Campeonato Brasileiro Série A. It began on September 6, 1960, and ended on December  28, 1960.

Format
The competition was a single elimination knockout tournament featuring two-legged ties, with a Tie-Break (play-off) if the sides were tied on points (however, if the tie-break was a draw, the aggregate score of the first two legs was used to determine the winner).

Teams

Northern Zone

Northeastern Group

Northern Group

Northern Zone Final

Southern Zone

Southern Group

Eastern Group

Southern Zone Final

National Semi-Finals
Palmeiras and Santa Cruz-PE entered at this stage.

National Final

References

External links
1960 Taça Brasil

Brazil
1
Taça Brasil seasons
B